There are approximately 1,162 townlands in County Laois, Ireland.  A plain version of this list showing townland names only is also available for easy alphabetical navigation and convenient overview.

Duplicate names occur where there is more than one townland with the same name in the county. Names marked in bold typeface are towns and villages, and the word Town appears for those entries in the Acres column.

References

 List
Laois
Laois
Townlands